The Count of Monte Cristo is a musical based on the famed 1844 novel of the same name by Alexandre Dumas, with influences from the 2002 film adaptation of the book. The music is written by Frank Wildhorn and the lyrics and book are by Jack Murphy.

Development 
The musical had a New York City workshop in November 2008, starring Brandi Burkhardt, James Barbour, Natalie Toro, Gregg Edelmann and several others from the Broadway production of A Tale of Two Cities, and many known Wildhorn favorites. After the workshop, concept recording was released on December 12, 2008. It starred several European theatrical superstars and the recording went platinum.

The show premiered (in German as Der Graf von Monte Christo) on March 14, 2009, in the Theater St. Gallen, St. Gallen, Switzerland. The production was directed by Andreas Gergen, with Thomas Borchert starring as The Count. The role of Mercédès was played by Sophie Berner.

On April 21, 2010, the first licensed international production of the show premiered in Universal Arts Center, Seoul, Korea, directed by Robert Johanson, and closed on June 13. The production later returned in 2011 and 2013, with minor changes in the plot and songs.

The English-language U.S. premiere was performed at Brigham Young University in Provo, Utah, United States. The show ran from January 22–31, 2015. Frank Wildhorn had visited BYU to perform and teach master classes to students, and was so impressed with the level of talent shown that he asked if BYU would like to present the US premiere of the musical.

The American professional premiere was produced by Pioneer Theatre Company in Salt Lake City, in May 2016, under the direction of Marcia Milgrom Dodge.

Summary 
"From the Tony Award-nominated composer of The Scarlet Pimpernel and Jekyll & Hyde comes this swashbuckling musical adventure of vengeance, mercy, and the redemptive power of love.

Falsely accused of colluding with the exiled Napoleon Bonaparte in 19th century France, newlywed seaman Edmond Dantès suddenly finds himself thrown into a Mediterranean island prison without a trial. Money in hand, Dantès transforms himself into the powerful and mysterious Count of Monte Cristo and embarks upon a quest to avenge those who stole the heart of his beloved bride, Mercedes, and conspired to destroy him."

Plot

Prologue 
''Edmond Dantès, a young, naïve second mate of a French trading ship, for the Morrell Shipping Company, lands the ship on the island of Elba to seek medical attention for his dying captain. While on the island, the exiled French Emperor Napoleon Bonaparte gives Dantès a letter to deliver to a friend in Dantès' home of Marseille ("Prologue - Let Justice Be Done").

Act I 
Dantès returns home and is greeted by his fiancée Mercédès and best friend Fernand Mondego. When Morrell asks what has become of the captain, Danglars, the first mate of the ship, reveals that the captain is dead and Dantès disobeyed orders by bringing him to Elba. Instead of becoming upset, Morrell commends Dantès and promotes him to captain. Danglars becomes furious and plots revenge on Dantès. Now that Dantès has been made captain he does not have to wait to marry Mercédès and the two revel in the news ("When Love is True").

Mondego is also in love with Mercédès and secretly hates Dantès for his engagement to her. Having knowledge of the letter given to Dantès by Napoleon, something considered an act of treason, Danglars recruits Mondego in his plot to ruin Dantès.

At his home, Dantès celebrates his promotion and engagement with Mercédès, his family, and friends ("Raise A Glass"). Suddenly, the party is interrupted by Gendarmes who place Dantès under arrest for being a Bonapartist. Dantès' friends refuse to give him up, but Dantès agrees to go willingly, believing it is simply a mistake and he will be returned home. Before Dantès leaves, he asks Mondego to take care of Mercédès until he returns.

Dantès is taken to the chief magistrate, Gérard de Villefort. After much interrogation Villefort is convinced that Dantès is innocent and prepares to set him free. However, before letting Dantès go, Villefort asks him for the identity of the man Napoleon's letter was to be delivered to. Villefort is horrified when Dantès, unwittingly, reveals the recipient as Villefort's father. Fearing the destruction of his own reputation, Villefort retracts his decision to set Dantès free and sentences him to life imprisonment in the island prison, Château d'If.

Danglars and Mondego are revealed to be responsible for alerting Villefort and having Dantès arrested. The three men meet and explain how their actions are justified by the rules of human nature stating that only the strong survive, and how it was the only way to get what they wanted: Danglars, his captain-ship; Mondego, the chance to court Mercédès; and Villefort, his reputation ("A Story Told").

Dantès is branded and thrown into his prison cell. Meanwhile, Mercédès prays for his return. Both vow to always be there for each other, no matter how far the distance between them ("I Will Be There").

Years pass and Dantès remains locked away, slowly losing all hope of returning home. Back in Marseille, Mondego has been trying to win Mercédès' heart, but in vain: in this moment of worry and anguish the only thing she wants to hear is some news about her fiancé and his imprisonment, wondering why the jailers and who arrested him haven't realized yet their mistake in not believing at Edmond's innocence ("Is there any news?"). Realizing she would never betray Dantès knowing he is alive, he tells her that Dantès was killed in an accident ("Every Day a Little Death").

One day, Dantès is awoken by strange noises. An old man suddenly breaks through the stone and raises through the floor of Dantès' cell. The old man introduces himself as Abbé Faria and explains that he had been tunneling his way to freedom, but accidentally chose the wrong direction and ended up in Dantès' cell. Faria requests Dantès' help in digging the tunnel and in return offers Dantès, who is illiterate, a proper education. Dantès agrees and the two prisoners begin digging, in the right direction, while Faria teaches Dantès mathematics, philosophy, military strategy, literature, economics, and hand-to-hand combat. The two men quickly form a friendship and share the stories of their lives before their imprisonment. Faria reveals he was once a priest and academic who served the immensely wealthy Count Chésele Spada, and was granted knowledge of where the Count had hidden away his fortune: on the remote island of Monte Cristo. Faria promises to share the treasure with Dantès in return for his assistance. ("Lessons Learned").

The tunnel suddenly collapses, mortally wounding Faria. As he lays dying in Dantès' arms he grants Dantès the entire fortune on Monte Cristo. They share a dream they know will never come to pass: both of them free and surrounded by riches. Faria asks that Dantès forgive and forget, but Dantès can't bring himself to do so; he wants revenge. ("When We Are Kings").

When the prison guards discover Faria has died they put him in a body bag. When they leave to get a chart to wheel the body out, Dantès switches places with the corpse. The guards return and, not noticing the difference, throw Dantès into the sea.

Dantès is picked up by a pirate ship, captained by the smuggler Luisa Vampa. Vampa forces Dantès to knife fight with Jacopo, a member of the crew. Due to his training with Faria, Dantès easily defeats his opponent, but refuses to kill him. Vampa allows both men to live, and Jacopo vows to serve Dantès forever. Dantès asks the pirates to drop him and Jacopo off on the island of Monte Cristo ("Pirates - Truth Or Dare").

Once on the island, Dantès finds Spada's treasure and reinvents himself as the wealthy Count of Monte Cristo ("The Treasure / When We Are Kings - Reprise")

Mercédès has been in a loveless marriage with Mondego for many years, and the two of them have a son named Albert, who has just turned eighteen. Albert begs his mother for permission to attend Carnival in Rome, but she refuses believing he is too young and would be without a chaperone. Mondego cares very little for his son, and quickly agrees when Albert asks him for permission. Once left alone, Mercédès muses on her unhappy marriage ("When the World was Mine").

Dantès, as the Count of Monte Cristo, decides to spend some time in Italy, surrounding himself with beautiful women who dance for him, but cannot take any enjoyment from it ("Dance The Tarantella"). Jacopo returns from a mission given to him by Dantès, to discover what has become of the men who betrayed him. Jacopo divulges that Danglars has become a Baron, who bought out Morrell's company, and Villefort has become chief prosecutor in Paris; but he is reluctant to speak of Mondego or Mercédès. When Dantès demands to know of Mercédès, Jacopo tells him of her marriage to Mondego and of their son, Albert. Dantès, overcome with rage, vows a terrible revenge on all his conspirators, including Mercédès, for she has betrayed him by stepping into a marriage with another man and having a child together, breaking the vow of undying faithfulness she previously swore to the sailor ("Hell to Your Doorstep").

Act II 

Albert is celebrating Carnival with his friends in Rome ("Carnival In Rome / Tarantella - Reprise"). He is lured away from the festivities by a beautiful young woman, and captured by bandits. Dantès is there as well, pretending to have been captured also. When Albert tells him he was captured due to a woman, the two men talk of the power women hold over men ("Ah, Women"). Albert reveals he is in love with Villefort's daughter, Valentine, whom he is also engaged with. When the bandits return, Dantès breaks free of his bonds and fights them while Albert hides. The bandits are revealed to be Luisa Vampa and her band of pirates, now working for Dantès. This was all Dantès' plan to become acquainted with Albert in order to gain access to Mondego. Dantès pays the pirates for their service and they disperse. Albert thanks his "savior" and asks who he is. Dantès introduces himself as the Count of Monte Cristo, and invites Albert, and his parents, to a ball he will be holding at the extravagant mansion he bought after arrived in Paris.

All the upper class of France attend Dantès' ball and gossip about their mysterious host ("That's What They Say"). Dantès arrives and dazzles all present with his charm and seemingly endless wealth. Jacopo presents at first the baron and the baroness Danglars, who immediately trying to entertain financial agreements with the new rich nobleman, and after the chief prosecutor Villefort with his wife, while Albert presents his fiancée Valentine and his father, Mondego. None of the men recognize the Count of Monte Cristo as Dantès. Mondego introduces Mercédès, who instantly recognizes her former love. She is sent into a state of shock and tries to speak, but Dantès avoided and ignored her for all the evening, clarifying with the woman there's nothing left to say between them anymore ("I Know Those Eyes / This Man Is Dead").

Dantès sets a trap for Danglars, Villefort and Mondego, sending Jacopo to them with instructions to invest their fortunes into the company, "Llerrom International;" a company which, unbeknownst to them, Dantès owns. The men do so, and profit substantially as a result. Danglars plots to become the richest man in Paris, Villefort plans to bribe voters in his future election campaigns, and Mondego hopes to bask in a never ending flood of wine and women. With his enemies vulnerable Dantès liquidates Llerrom International, causing the villainous trio to lose their fortunes and be publicly ruined. Danglars commits suicide and Villefort is sent to prison; Mondego, the last of the traitors, reads the name Llerrom backwards and sees that it spells "Morrell" in reverse. Remembering how Dantès worked for the Morrell Shipping Company, Mondego deduces the Count of Monte Cristo's true identity. ("The Trap / Too Much Is Never Enough").

When the news breaks of what the Count has done, Albert considers his family disgraced and arranges a duel with him. Mercédès tries to talk her son out of it, but Albert refuses to relent. Valentine privately muses on her father, who she thought was a good and right man, only to see him revealed as a scoundrel under a flawless façade. What she only desires now is to get rid of all those lies and discover the world for what it really is in its fullness, both in good and bad, without stopping only at its side of wonders and beauty ("Pretty Lies").

Mercédès goes to the Count and begs him to spare Albert's life, revealing her knowledge of his true identity. However, Dantès still has not forgiven Mercédès for marrying Mondego and refuses, stating, "Pity is for the weak." Mercédès is left to reflect on her wasted life and blame herself for being so blind and for having given up to wait for Edmond during those long years, but still she didn't give up on the dream of being together once more under the light of the star that would always guide them to one another ("All This Time").

The duel between Dantès and Albert commences and the two draw pistols. Albert misses his shot, leaving Dantès the victor. As Dantès prepares to kill Albert, Valentine jumps between them and implores that Albert be spared, declaring her love for him. Valentine is pulled away, leaving Albert open once again. However, Dantès simply shoots into the air, sparing his opponent's life. The duel ends and the young lovers run off.

Touched by the love Valentine showed for Albert, Dantès begins an internal search for his former self and sheds away all of the pain he suffered over the years, believing he has, at last, found peace ("The Man I Used To Be").

Dantès reunites with Mercédès at his mansion and forgives her after knowing the truth behind Mercédès' decision of marrying another due to Mondego's lie that claimed him dead in prison. Mondego suddenly appears, demanding his wife back, and engages Dantès in a vicious sword fight. Dantès emerges victorious, but can not bring himself to kill his rival. Dantès allows Mondego to live and sets him free, but Mondego refuses to surrender and again rushes at Dantès, intending to stab him from behind. Out of defense, the Count is forced to mortally wound Mondego and finally put an end on their duel. ("Hell To Your Doorstep - Reprise").

Dantès can't forgive what he has just done, not in his former intentions, wondering if he really has the right to deserve peace after the sorrow he mercilessly caused with his revenge plan and for all the innocents that have been unfairly wronged because of it, or if there'll be any mercy for Mondego's soul and the murdering guilt he now has towards him. Mercédès reassures the man that what really killed Mondego at the very end was the rage and hate he wasn't capable of letting go of, along with his selfish choices that led him to his own demise; the woman, with her love and compassion, finally frees Dantès's heart from all the pain of the past.
Together again, the two lovers embrace and renew their vow never to leave each other ("Finale: I Will Be There - Reprise").

Song list

Musical

Act I
 Prologue (Let Justice Be Done) - Ensemble
 When Love is True - Dantès and Mercédès 
 Raise a Glass - Ensemble
 A Story Told - Mondego, Danglars, and Villefort
 I Will Be There - Dantès and Mercédès 
 Is there any news? - Mondego and Mercédès
 Everyday a Little Death - Dantès, Mercédès, and Mondego
 Lesson's Learned - Abbé Faria and Dantès
 When We are Kings - Abbé Faria and Dantès
 Pirates (Truth or Dare) - Luisa Vampa, Pirates, and Dantès
 The Treasure (When We are Kings [Reprise]) - Dantès
 When the World Was Mine - Mercédès
 Dance The Tarantella - Courtesans
 Hell to Your Doorstep - Dantès

Act II
 Carnival In Rome / Tarantella (Reprise) - Ensemble
 Ah, Women - Dantès/Monte Cristo and Albert
 That's What They Say - Ensemble
 I Know Those Eyes / This Man is Dead - Dantès/Monte Cristo and Mercédès
 The Trap / Too Much Is Never Enough - Dantès/Monte Cristo, Mondego, Danglars, Villefort 
 Pretty Lies - Valentine de Villefort
 All This Time - Mercédès
 The Man I Used to Be - Dantès/Monte Cristo
 Hell To Your Doorstep (Reprise) - Mondego and Dantès
 Finale: I Will Be There (Reprise) - Dantès and Mercédès

Highlights from the Musical concept album
Except for the prologue, which is sung in Latin, all songs are performed in English.
 Prologue (Let Justice Be Done) - Ensemble
 When Love is True - Thomas Borchert and Brandi Burkhardt
 A Story Told - Patrick Stanke, Mathias Edenborn, and Mark Seibert
 I Will Be There - Borchert and Burkhardt
 Everyday a Little Death - Borchert, Burkhardt, and Stanke
 When We are Kings - Borchert and Alexander Goebel
 When the World Was Mine - Burkhardt
 Hell to Your Doorstep - Borchert
 Ah, Women - Borchert and Jesper Tydén
 I Know Those Eyes / This Man is Dead - Borchert and Burkhardt
 Pretty Lies - Pia Douwes
 All This Time - Burkhardt
 The Man I Used to Be - Borchert

Notes

Characters and casts 

† Songs featuring Luisa Vampa are absent from the concept album.

Recordings 
 2008 Original Concept Cast Recording (Highlights)
 2009 Original St. Gallen Cast Recording (Highlights)
 2010 Original Korean Cast Recording (Highlights with Alternate Cast versions on "I Will Be There" and "Hell To Your Doorstep")
 In November 2017, the musical was brought to St. Petersburg's Musical Comedy Theatre in Russia, getting a brand new premiere: from the original German performance, some plot choices were changed and variations added. For the occasion, the Russian version was gifted of new compositions by Frank Wildhorn himself, by also showing a reprise of "Every day a little death" (sung by Albert, Mercédès and Valentine while the two of them are trying to convince the boy in renouncing to challenge Monte-Cristo) and of "That's what they say", placed later the events of their duel, after the news of Mondego, Danglars and Villefort's downfall breaks  among Paris’ upper class .

References

External links
The Count of Monte Cristo information and song list at frankwildhorn.com 

2009 musicals
Musicals based on novels
Musicals by Frank Wildhorn
Works based on The Count of Monte Cristo
Musicals based on works by Alexandre Dumas